The Martinikerk (also Sint Martinuskerk or Hervormde kerk) is a church in Doesburg, Netherlands.

History
1547 it was struck by lightning, heavily damaging church and tower. The tower was again damaged by French troops in 1672, the rampjaar. It was once more struck by lightning in 1717 and in 1783 became the first building in the Netherlands to be protected from lightning by a lightning rod.

It was restored 1919–1930 by W. te Riele and N. de Wolf, and restored again after it was heavily damaged when retreating German troops blew up the tower in April 1945.

Gallery

See also
 List of tallest structures built before the 20th century

Notes and references

External links
 Official website

Protestant churches in the Netherlands
Churches in Gelderland
Rijksmonuments in Gelderland
Towers in Gelderland
Doesburg